Louis Philippe, comte de Ségur (10 December 175327 August 1830) was a French diplomat and historian.

Biography
Ségur was born in Paris, the son of Philippe Henri, marquis de Ségur and Louise Anne Madeleine de Vernon. He entered the army in 1769, served in the American War of Independence in 1781 as a colonel under Rochambeau.

In 1784 he was sent as minister plenipotentiary to Saint Petersburg, where he was received into the intimacy of the empress Catherine II and wrote some comedies for her theatre. At Saint Petersburg he concluded (in January 1787) a commercial treaty which was exceedingly advantageous to France. The same year he accompanied Catherine II in her journey to the Crimea. He returned to Paris in 1789.

Ségur took up a sympathetic attitude towards the Revolution at its outset and in 1791 was sent on a mission to Berlin, where he was badly received. After fighting a duel he was forced to leave Berlin, and went into retirement until 1801 when, at Bonaparte's command, he was nominated by the senate to the Corps Législatif. Subsequently he became a member of the council of state, grand master of the ceremonies, and senator, 1813. In 1814 Ségur voted for the deposition of Napoleon and entered Louis XVIII's Chamber of Peers. Deprived of his offices and functions in 1815 for joining Napoleon during the Hundred Days, he was reinstated in 1819, supported the Revolution of 1830, but died shortly afterwards in Paris.

Ségur married on 30 April 1777 Antoinette Élisabeth d'Aguesseau, who also died in Paris, and had three sons and one daughter:
 Laure Antoinette de Ségur (11 April 177815 July 1812), married Louis Auguste Vallet de La Touche, baron de Villeneuve, marquis du Blanc (Paris, 4 February 1779le Blanc, Indre, 24 December 1837), and had issue
 Octave-Henri Gabriel, comte de Ségur (Paris, 5 June 1779Paris, 15 August 1818), soldier and famous suicide
 Philippe Paul, comte de Ségur (Paris, 4 November 1780Paris, 25 February 1873), general and historian
 Olivier Alexandre de Ségur (3 October 17904 May 1791)

Bibliography

Histoire des principaux évènements du règne de Fréderic-Guillaume II (1800)
Pensées politiques (Paris, 1795)
Histoire de France (n vols., 1824–1834)
Histoire des juifs (1827)
Mémoires (3 vols., 1824)
Contes (1809)
His Œuvres complètes were published in 34 volumes in 1824 et seq.

References

Louis Philippe, comte de
Members of the Académie Française
Members of the Sénat conservateur
French military personnel of the American Revolutionary War
1753 births
1830 deaths
Diplomats from Paris
18th-century French diplomats
French duellists
Members of the Chamber of Peers of the Hundred Days
Ambassadors of France to the Russian Empire
19th-century French historians